Qarajelu or Qarajalu, also rendered as Qarah Jalu or Qareh Jalu may refer to:
 Qarajelu, Kurdistan
 Qarajelu, Khoy, West Azerbaijan Province
 Qarah Jalu, Poldasht County, West Azerbaijan Province
 Qarajalu, Urmia, West Azerbaijan Province
 Qarajalu, Nazlu, Urmia County, West Azerbaijan Province